John Julius Sviokla is an author and a principal and US Advisory Innovation Leader with PricewaterhouseCoopers (PwC). He also serves on PwC’s Advisory Leadership Group, the Global Thought Leadership Council, and leads The Exchange — an ongoing think tank for PwC clients and business leaders. Previously, he served as Vice Chairman of the Board and Chief Innovation Officer at Diamond Management Consultants (NASDAQ:DTPI).

Career
Dr. John Sviokla has nearly 30 years of experience researching, writing and consulting on topics of innovation, technology, strategy and economic value. He has global experience serving a wide variety of clients. He works across many industries and businesses applying his expertise in customer behavior, economics, psychology, behavioral economics, sociology, business strategy, network analysis, measurement and leadership.

He has created some of the first thought leadership pieces on the coming world of digital competition including, Managing in the Marketspace, (1994) and Exploiting the Virtual Value Chain. He is also a major contributor to Oxford Economics study on Digital Megatrends 2015.

Dr. Sviokla earned his Bachelor's degree from Harvard College and obtained his Masters and Doctorate degree from Harvard Business School. He served on the Harvard Business School faculty from 1986-1998.

Publications 
 Sviokla, John J. and Bothun, Deborah: You're a Media company. Now What? Four strategies that work in this dynamic new world, Strategy + Business, The University of Chicago Booth School of Business, June 2016
 Sviokla, John J. and Cohen, Mitch: The Self-Made Billionaire Effect: How Extreme Producers Create Massive Value, Portfolio, December 2014.
 Sviokla, John J.: The  Courage To Change Before You have To, Strategy + Business, The University of Chicago Booth School of Business, June 2016
 Sviokla, John J. Stop Driving Away your Producers: Many companies undervalue their highest-potential talent: the leaders who create new businesses,
September 29, 2015 by John Sviokla and Mitch Cohen
 Sviokla, John J. and Cohen, Mitch: The Two Types of High-Potential Talent, July 2015
 Sviokla, John J. and Cohen, Mitch: What Self-Made Billionaires Do Best: They don’t just generate results. They produce breakthroughs, December 2014
 Sviokla, John J. How Old Industries Become Young Again: Five indicators reveal when your sector is about to be transformed by dematurity
July 2014
 Sviokla, John J., Hiddin, Gezius J, Williams, Jeffrey R.: The IT Platform Principle: The First Shall Not Be First, The Wall Street Journal, January 2010. www.wsj.com/articles/SB10001424052748704007804574574211232106776
 Sviokla, John J. and Rayport, Jeffrey F.: Managing in the Marketspace, Harvard Business Review, November/December 1994.
 Sviokla, John J. and Rayport, Jeffrey F." Exploiting the Virtual Value Chain, Harvard Business Review, November/December 1995.
 Sviokla, John J (Author, Editor) and Shapiro Benson P. (Author): Seeking Customers, Harvard Business Review Press, April 1, 1993)
 Sviokla, John J (Author) and Shapiro Benson P. (Editor): Keeping Customers, Harvard Business Review Press, April 1, 1993)
 Sviokla, John J Planpower, XCON, and MUDMAN: An in-depth analysis of three commercial expert systems in use, (Working paper), Harvard Business School, 1989
 Sviokla, John J: The Innovation Daily Blog at https://www.facebook.com/search/str/John%2BSviokla/keywords_top
 Sviokla, John J: Innovating at Scale in a Successful Company, June 2010, http://innovationexcellence.com/blog/2010/06/23/innovating-at-scale-in-a-successful-company

References

External links
 http://www.pwc.com/us/en/contacts/j/john-sviokla.html
 http://www.pwc.com/us/en/self-made-billionaire-effect.html
 http://www.strategy-business.com/author?author=John+Sviokla
 CIO Staff: John Sviokla on Redefining Knowledge Management, February 2001,  http://www.cio.com/article/2441797/enterprise-software/john-sviokla-on-redefining-knowledge-management.html
 https://www.amazon.com/John-J.-Sviokla/e/B00ITEH52A
 https://www.theguardian.com/activate/john-sviokla
 http://video.cnbc.com/gallery/?video=3000342653
 Buscell, Prucia: Disruption, 'Dematurity' and Cooperative Commercialization, August 2014, http://www.plexusinstitute.org/blogpost/656763/194781/Disruption--Dematurity-and-Cooperative-Commercialization
 http://www.slideshare.net/jsviokla
 Buyting, Andy: What I Learned from John Sviokla, http://www.carlepublishing.com/what-i-learned-from-john-sviokla-the-self-made-billionaire-effect/
 Interview with John Sviokla: Trillions Spent in Advertising & Marketing: Most of It Utterly Inefficient, https://www.wordnik.com/words/Sviokla

Business speakers
American business theorists
Harvard Business School alumni
Living people
Year of birth missing (living people)